Luca Giuseppe "Luke" Pasqualino (born 19 February 1990) is a British actor of Italian descent. He is best known for his portrayal of Freddie McClair in the television series Skins, d'Artagnan in the television series The Musketeers and Elvis Harte in Our Girl.

Early life
Pasqualino was born in Peterborough, Cambridgeshire, to Italian parents from Sicily and Naples. He attended Walton Community School, in Walton, Peterborough.

Career
In 2009, Pasqualino made his acting debut as the protagonist in the low-budget film Stingers Rule! about a local football team going against property developers who plan to destroy their beloved football ground. Pasqualino also guest starred on Casualty and Miranda. In 2008, Pasqualino became one of the new series regulars in the third season of the E4 teenage drama television series Skins; he portrayed Freddie McClair, a laid-back weed-smoking college pupil. In February 2010, Pasqualino was cast in the Warner Bros. Pictures supernatural horror film The Apparition; the film was released in August 2012. In 2011, Pasqualino appeared in a recurring role as Paolo, a young servant, on the historical drama television series The Borgias. In July 2012, Pasqualino starred in the romantic comedy film Love Bite.

In October 2011, Pasqualino won the starring role in the Syfy television pilot Battlestar Galactica: Blood & Chrome  as the younger self of William "Husker" Adama; the show was first distributed as a ten-episode online series on Machinima.com starting November 2012, and then aired in early 2013 as a televised film on Syfy. Later in 2013 Pasqualino appeared in a French television series, Jo. From 2014 to 2016 he starred in the BBC production of The Musketeers, based on the Alexandre Dumas novel.

In 2013, Pasqualino appeared in the ensemble thriller Snowpiercer, which takes place aboard a train as it travels around the globe, carrying the last members of humanity after a failed attempt at climate engineering to stop global warming. In 2021, he played David Kostyk in the Netflix series Shadow and Bone.

Filmography

Film

Television

References

External links
 
 

Living people
English people of Italian descent
British people of Italian descent
English people of Sicilian descent
People of Campanian descent
English male soap opera actors
English male film actors
English male stage actors
People from Peterborough
People educated at The Voyager School
21st-century English male actors
Male actors from Cambridgeshire
1990 births